The  New York Giants season was the franchise's 38th season in the National Football League.
Giants quarterback Y. A. Tittle had a breakout season in 1962. Said Cold Hard Football Facts, "It's safe to call Tittle a late bloomer. He enjoyed various degrees of success in his first 14 seasons with three teams in two different pro football leagues. But then in 1962, at the age of 36 and under second-year head coach Allie Sherman, Tittle exploded for a record 33 TD passes to lead the Giants to a 12–2 record."

Offseason

NFL Draft

Hall of Fame Game
New York Giants 21, St. Louis Cardinals 21

Roster

Regular season

Schedule

Note: Intra-conference opponents are in bold text.

Game summaries

Week 14

    
    
    
    
    
    
    
    
    
    
    

Y. A. Tittle 21/42, 341 Yds, 6 TD, 2 INT

Standings

Playoffs

Awards and honors
 Andy Robustelli, Bert Bell Award
Del Shofner, Franchise Record, Most Receiving Yards in One Game, 269 Receiving Yards (October 28, 1962) 
Y. A. Tittle, NFL Record, Most Touchdown Passes in One Game, 7 Touchdown Passes (October 28, 1962)

See also
List of New York Giants seasons

References

 New York Giants on Pro Football Reference
 Giants on jt-sw.com

New York Giants seasons
New York Giants
1962 in sports in New York City
1960s in the Bronx